Thomas Paul Pukstys (born May 28, 1968) is a former American track and field athlete who was a javelin thrower.  Pukstys was a six-time U.S. javelin champion, and represented the United States at the 1992 and 1996 Summer Olympics.

Biography
Pukstys parents came to the U.S. from Lithuania in 1949.  He was born in Glen Ellyn, Illinois.  He graduated from Amos Alonzo Stagg High School in Palos Hills, Illinois.  His older brother Andrew was attending medical school in Lithuania, and returned home with a gift for Pukstys: a javelin.  Thereafter, Pukstys quit the high school baseball team, and went out for the track team, throwing the javelin 155 feet in his first track meet.

For his first two years as an undergraduate, Pukstys enrolled in the College of DuPage in Glen Ellyn, and was a member of the DuPage Chaparrals track and field team.  After his sophomore year, he accepted an athletic scholarship to transfer to the University of Florida in Gainesville, Florida, where he was a member of the Florida Gators track and field team.  He graduated from the University of Florida with a bachelor's degree in public relations in 1992.

Pukstys broke his first American record in June 1993.  His personal best was a throw of 87.12 meters in 1997.

Pusktys was an assistant track and field coach for the U.S. Olympic team that competed in the 2012 Summer Olympics in London.

Seasonal bests by year
1987 - 71.34
1988 - 75.72
1989 - 74.82
1990 - 83.30
1991 - 81.68
1992 - 83.20
1993 - 85.70
1994 - 82.32
1995 - 84.50
1996 - 86.82
1997 - 87.12
1998 - 85.06
1999 - 84.11
2000 - 84.25
2001 - 79.48
2003 - 79.31
2004 - 78.85

Achievements

See also 

 Florida Gators
 List of University of Florida alumni
 List of University of Florida Olympians

References 

 
 USATF Profile
 

1968 births
Living people
American male javelin throwers
American Olympic coaches
American people of Lithuanian descent
American track and field coaches
Athletes (track and field) at the 1992 Summer Olympics
Athletes (track and field) at the 1996 Summer Olympics
Florida Gators men's track and field athletes
Olympic track and field athletes of the United States
People from Glen Ellyn, Illinois
Sportspeople from DuPage County, Illinois
Track and field athletes from Illinois
Junior college men's track and field athletes in the United States
Goodwill Games medalists in athletics
Competitors at the 1998 Goodwill Games